The 2014 season was Terengganu's 4th season in the Malaysia Super League, and their 19th consecutive season in the top-flight of Malaysian football. In addition, they were competing in the domestic tournaments, the 2013 Malaysia FA Cup and the 2013 Malaysia Cup

Terengganu announced their sponsors for the 2014 season as well as presenting the new kits on 14 January 2014.

Club

Current coaching staff

Management 

 Last updated: 28 October 2013

Kit sponsors
• Umbro • 
Desa Murni Batik •
Zon Ria •
Ladang Rakyat •
Kuala Terengganu Specialist Hospital •
Top IT

Players

Squad information

Last update: 30 April 2014
Source: 
Ordered by squad number.
LPLocal player; FPForeign player; NRNon-registered player

Transfers and loans

All start dates are pending confirmation.

In

November

April

Out

November

April

Loan in

Pre-season and friendlies

Super League

League table

Results summary

Results by round

Matches 

 
Kickoff times are in +08:00 GMT.

FA Cup

Terengganu entered the 2014 Malaysia FA Cup in January, in the round of 16. First opponent was Shahzan Muda.

Round of 32

Round of 16

Malaysia Cup

Group stage

Knockout phase

Quarter-finals

Source: FAM
Last updated: 18 July 2014

Statistics

Squad statistics

|-
! colspan="14" style="background:#dcdcdc; text-align:center"| Goalkeepers

|-
! colspan="14" style="background:#dcdcdc; text-align:center"| Defenders

|-
! colspan="14" style="background:#dcdcdc; text-align:center"| Midfielders

|-
! colspan="14" style="background:#dcdcdc; text-align:center"| Forwards

|-
! colspan="14" style="background:#dcdcdc; text-align:center"| Transfers Out

Top scorers

Last updated: 16 October 2014
Source: Match reports in Competitive matches

Clean sheets

Last updated: 25 March 2014
Source: Match reports in Competitive matches

Disciplinary record

Scoring records

First goal of the season in Super League: Mamadou Barry against PKNS (18 January 2014)
First goal of the season in FA Cup: Márcio Souza against Shahzan Muda (21 January 2014)
First goal of the season in Cup:
Fastest goal of the season in Super League: 11 minutes Javier Estupiñán against LionsXII (17 May 2014)
Fastest goal of the season in FA Cup: 11 minutes Márcio Souza against Shahzan Muda (21 January 2014)
Fastest goal of the season in Cup:
Biggest win of the season in Super League: 4–1 vs Pahang (24 May 2014)
Biggest win of the season in FA Cup: 4–0 vs Shahzan Muda (21 January 2014)
Biggest win of the season in Cup:
Biggest loss of the season in Super League: 2–0 vs Perak (19 April 2014)
Biggest loss of the season in FA Cup: 
Biggest loss of the season in Cup:

See also
 2014 Malaysia Super League season

References

External links
 Facebook PBSNT
 Facebook Terengganu FA
 Facebook GanuSoccer.Net
 Facebook Terengganu FC
 Facebook UltrasTranung
 Facebook Kelab Penyokong PETEH
 Facebook AnokTranung FC
 Facebook Media Turtle
 Facebook PETEH GANU PETEH

Terengganu FC seasons
Malaysian football clubs 2014 season
Malaysian football club seasons by club